Benign lipoblastomatosis is a tumor consisting of fetal-embryonal adipocytes, frequently confused with a liposarcoma, affecting exclusively infants and young children, with approximately 90% of cases occurring before 3 years of age. The term lipoblastomatosis was first used by Vellios et al. in 1958, at which point the tumor became generally accepted as a distinctive entity. Today Diffuse lipoblastoma is the preferred term for Lipoblastomatosis. The tumor is rare, accounting for less than 1% of all childhood neoplasm, and it has been found to be more common in males than females. It often presents as an asymptomatic rapidly enlarging mass, occurring more often in the soft tissues of the extremities.

See also
 Myxoid lipoblastoma
 List of cutaneous conditions

References

External links 

 

Dermal and subcutaneous growths